Robert Francis Tatarek (born July 3, 1946) is a retired professional American football player who played primarily for the Buffalo Bills of the American Football League, and later the National Football League. He last played in the NFL in 1972, splitting time between the Bills and the Detroit Lions. From 1974 he played in the World Football League for the Jacksonville Sharks and the Birmingham Americans, once the Sharks folded in-season. He finally played in 1975 for the Birmingham Vulcans.

External links

Living people
Miami Hurricanes football players
Buffalo Bills players
Detroit Lions players
Jacksonville Sharks (WFL) players
Birmingham Americans players
Birmingham Vulcans players
Players of American football from Pennsylvania
People from Greensburg, Pennsylvania
1946 births
American Football League players